The 2003 Berlin Thunder season was the fifth season for the franchise in the NFL Europe League (NFLEL). The team was led by head coach Peter Vaas in his fourth year, and played its home games at Olympic Stadium in Berlin, Germany. They finished the regular season in sixth place with a record of three wins and seven losses.

Offseason

Free agent draft

Personnel

Staff

Roster

Standings

References

Berlin
Berlin Thunder seasons